Jean-Baptiste Dejeanty, born 13 February 1978 is a French professional sailor born in Paimpol in Brittany but now living in Port-Louis.

Biography
He studied Naval Architecture at University of Southampton. In 2001, he opened his own construction site, Artech, and built a Mini 6.50 with which he took part in the Transat 6.50 in 2003. He then moved to the IMOCA class and in 2008 he was the youngest competitor to start the Vendée Globe in Maisonneuve - Lower Normandy Region although he retired due to structural failure. He tried to have a campaign for the 2012 edition but had funding issues caused by the sponsor not putting forwards the agreed funds.

Key Results

Reference

External links
 Official Facebook Page

1978 births
Living people
People from Paimpol
French male sailors (sport)
Sportspeople from Côtes-d'Armor
Alumni of the University of Southampton

IMOCA 60 class sailors
French Vendee Globe sailors
2008 Vendee Globe sailors